Living Large... is the debut studio album by American hip hop group Heavy D & the Boyz. It was released on October 27, 1987, through Uptown Records. The production was handled by Andre Harrell, DJ Eddie F, Teddy Riley, Marley Marl and Heavy D. The album was a success for the group, reaching number 92 on the Billboard 200 and number 10 on the Top R&B/Hip-Hop Albums chart. It sold over 300,000 copies. Living Large... is today considered to be a classic. Three singles were released: "Mr. Big Stuff", "Chunky But Funky" and "Don't You Know".

In 1998, the album was selected as one of The Sources 100 Best Rap Albums Ever.

Track listing

Charts

Weekly charts

Year-end charts

References

External links

Heavy D albums
1987 debut albums
MCA Records albums
Uptown Records albums
Albums produced by Eddie F
Albums produced by Marley Marl
Albums produced by Teddy Riley
Albums produced by Andre Harrell